22889 / 90 Samudra Kanya Express is a Express train belonging to Indian Railways East Coast Railway zone that run between  and  in India.

Service 
It operates as train number 22889 from Puri to Digha and as train number 22890 in the reverse direction, serving the states of Odisha & West Bengal.

Coaches
The 22889 / 90 Samudra Kanya  Express has one AC 2-tier,  two AC 3-tier, nine sleeper class, four general unreserved & two SLR (seating with luggage rake) coaches. It doesn't carry a pantry car.

As with most train services in India, coach composition may be amended at the discretion of Indian Railways depending on demand.

Routing

Traction
As this route is going to be electrified, a Visakhapatnam-based electric WAP-4 loco pulls the train to its destination.

Rake sharing
The train shares its rake with Puri Baidyanath Dham Express and 12895/12896 Howrah–Puri Express.

References

 http://www.eastcoastrail.indianrailways.gov.in/view_detail.jsp?lang=0&dcd=513&id=0,4,268
 http://www.business-standard.com/article/economy-policy/new-train-between-puri-and-digha-112021700008_1.html
 http://trainspy.com/static/train/22890/PURI-DGHA-SUP-E
 http://www.pnrstatus.co.in/renumbering-of-trains-with-effect-from-1st-october-2012/
 http://www.eastcoastrail.indianrailways.gov.in/cris/view_detail.jsp?lang=0&id=0,4,268&dcd=673&did=13424464515321094208EF57F1518CD1B4D6610CA23EA.web91
 https://web.archive.org/web/20140929164445/http://orissadiary.com/CurrentNews.asp?id=22808

External links
22889 Samudra Kanya Express at India Rail Info
22890 Samudra Kanya Express at India Rail Info

Express trains in India
Rail transport in West Bengal
Rail transport in Odisha
Transport in Puri
Transport in Digha
Railway services introduced in 2010
Named passenger trains of India